Transrapid is a German-developed high-speed monorail train using magnetic levitation. Planning for the Transrapid system started in 1969 with a test facility for the system in Emsland, Germany completed in 1987. In 1991, technical readiness for application was approved by the Deutsche Bundesbahn in cooperation with renowned universities.

In 2002, the first commercial implementation was completed – the Shanghai Maglev Train, which connects the city of Shanghai's rapid transit network  to Shanghai Pudong International Airport. The Transrapid system has not yet been deployed on a long-distance intercity line.

The system is developed and marketed by Transrapid International, a joint venture of Siemens and ThyssenKrupp.

In 2011, the Emsland test track closed down when its operating license expired. In early 2012, demolition and reconversion of the entire Emsland site including the factory was approved. In September 2017, there were plans to use the last Transrapid 09 as a conference and museum space on the grounds of Fleischwarenfabrik Kemper.

Technology

Levitation
The super-speed Transrapid maglev system has no wheels, no axles, no gear transmissions, no steel rails, and no overhead electrical pantographs. The maglev vehicles do not roll on wheels; rather, they hover above the track guideway, using the attractive magnetic force between two linear arrays of electromagnetic coils—one side of the coil on the vehicle, the other side in the track guideway, which function together as a magnetic dipole. During levitation and travelling operation, the Transrapid maglev vehicle floats on a frictionless magnetic cushion with no mechanical contact whatsoever with the track guideway. On-board vehicle electronic systems measure the dipole gap distance 100,000 times per second to guarantee the clearance between the coils attached to the underside of the guideway and the magnetic portion of the vehicle wrapped around the guideway edges.

The Transrapid maglev vehicle requires less power to hover than it needs to run its on-board air conditioning equipment.

In Transrapid vehicle versions TR08 and earlier, when travelling at speeds below , the vehicle levitation system and all on-board vehicle electronics were supplied with power through physical connections to the track guideway. At vehicle speeds above , all on-board power was supplied by recovered harmonic oscillation of the magnetic fields created from the track's linear stator. (Since these oscillations are parasitic, they cannot be used for vehicle propulsion). A new energy transmission system, version TR09, has since been developed for Transrapid, in which maglev vehicles now require no physical contact with the track guideway for their on-board power needs, regardless of the maglev vehicle speed. This feature helps to reduce on-going maintenance and operational costs.

In case of power failure of the track's propulsion system, the maglev vehicle can use on-board backup batteries to temporarily power the vehicle's levitation system.

Propulsion
The Transrapid maglev system uses a synchronous longstator linear motor for both propulsion and braking. It works like a rotating electric motor whose stator is "unrolled" along the underside of the guideway; instead of producing torque (rotation) it produces a linear force along its length. The electromagnets in the maglev vehicle which lift it also work as the equivalent of the excitation portion (rotor) of this linear electric motor. Since the magnetic travelling field works in only one direction, if there were to be several maglev trains on a given track section, they would all travel in the same direction thereby reducing the possibility of collision between moving trains.

Energy requirements
The drag coefficient of the Transrapid is about 0.26.

Power consumption compares favourably with other high-speed rail systems. With an efficiency of 0.85, the power required is about 4.2 MW. Energy consumption for levitation and guidance purposes equates to approximately 1.7 kW/t. As the propulsion system is also capable of functioning in reverse, energy is transferred back into the electrical grid during braking. An exception to this is when an emergency stop is performed using the emergency landing skids beneath the vehicle, although this method of bringing the vehicle to a stop is intended only as a last resort should it be impossible or undesirable to keep the vehicle levitating on back-up power to a natural halt.

Market segment, ecological impact and historical parallels
Compared to classical railway lines, Transrapid allows higher speeds and gradients with less weathering and lower energy consumption and maintenance needs. The Transrapid track is more flexible, and more easily adapted to specific geographical circumstances than a classical train system. The magnetic field generator, an important part of the engine being a part of the track, limits the system capacity.

From a competition standpoint, the Transrapid is a proprietary solution. The track being a part of the engine, only the single-source Transrapid vehicles and infrastructure can be operated. There is no multisourcing foreseen concerning vehicles or the highly complicated crossings and switches. Unlike classical railways or other infrastructure networks, as jointly administrated by the Federal Network Agency (Bundesnetzagentur) in Germany, a Transrapid system does not allow any direct competition.

Ecological impact
The Transrapid is an electrically driven, clean, high-speed, high-capacity means of transport able to build up point-to-point passenger connections in geographically challenged surroundings. This has to be set in comparison with the impact on heritage and or landscape protection areas (compare Waldschlösschen Bridge). Any impact of emissions has to take into account the source of electrical energy. The reduced expense, noise and vibration of a people-only Transrapid system versus a cargo train track is not directly comparable. The reuse of existing tracks and the interfacing with existing networks is limited. The Transrapid indirectly competes for resources, space and tracks in urban and city surroundings with classical urban transport systems and high speed trains.

Comparative costs

Track construction cost
The fully elevated Shanghai Maglev was built at a cost 
of US$1.33 billion over a length of  including trains and stations. Thus the cost per km for dual track was US$43.6 million, including trains and stations. This was the first commercial use of the technology. Since then conventional fast rail track has been mass-produced in China for between US$4.6 and US$30.8 million per kilometer, mostly in rural areas. (See High-speed rail in China).

In 2008 Transrapid Australia quoted the Victoria State Government A$34 million per kilometer for dual track. This assumed 50% of the track was at grade and 50% was elevated. In comparison, the  Regional Rail Link to be built in Victoria will cost A$5 billion, or A$105 million per kilometer, including two stations.

From the above it is not possible to say whether Transrapid or conventional fast rail track would be cheaper for a particular application.

The higher operating speed of the maglev system will result in more passengers being delivered over the same distance in a set time. The ability of the Transrapid system to handle tighter turns and steeper gradients could heavily influence a cost comparison for a particular project.

Train purchase cost
In 2008, Transrapid Australia quoted the Victorian State Government between A$16.5 million (commuter) and A$20 million (luxury) per trains section or carriage. This works out at between A$179,000 and A$217,000 per square meter.

In comparison, InterCityExpress which are also built by Siemens cost about A$6 million per carriage. This works out at about A$83,000 per square meter.

This shows Transrapid train sets are likely to cost over twice as much as ICE 3 conventional fast rail train sets at this time. However, each Transrapid train set is more than twice as efficient due to their faster operating speed and acceleration according to UK Ultraspeed. In their case study only 44% as many Transrapid train sets are needed to deliver the same number of passengers as conventional high-speed trains.

Operational cost
Transrapid claims their system has very low maintenance costs compared to conventional high speed rail systems due to the non-contact nature of their system.

Implementations

China

The only commercial implementation so far was in the year 2000, when the Chinese government ordered a Transrapid track to be built connecting Shanghai to its Pudong International Airport.
It was inaugurated in 2002 and regular daily trips started in March 2004. The average number of riders per day (14 hours of operation) is about 7,500, while the maximum seating capacity per train is 440. A second class ticket price of about 50 RMB (renminbi) (about 6 euro) is four times the price of the airport bus and ten times more expensive than a comparable underground ticket.

The project was sponsored by the German Hermes loans with DM 200 million. The total cost is believed to be $1.33 billion.

A planned extension of the line to Shanghai Hongqiao Airport and onward to the city of Hangzhou has been repeatedly delayed.  Originally planned to be ready for Expo 2010, final approval was granted on 18 August 2008, and construction was scheduled to start in 2010 for completion in 2014. However the plan is cancelled, possibly due to the building of the high speed Shanghai–Hangzhou Passenger Railway.

Germany

The Emsland test facility was the only Transrapid track in Germany. It has been deactivated, and is scheduled to be disassembled.

Proposed systems

Iran
In 2007, Iran and a German company reached an agreement on using maglev trains to link the cities of Tehran and Mashhad. The agreement was signed at the Mashhad International Fair site between Iranian Ministry of Roads and Transportation and the German company. Munich-based Schlegel Consulting Engineers said they had signed the contract with the Iranian ministry of transport and the governor of Mashad. "We have been mandated to lead a German consortium in this project," a spokesman said. "We are in a preparatory phase." The next step will be to assemble a consortium, a process that is expected to take place "in the coming months," the spokesman said. The project could be worth between 10 billion and 12 billion euros, the Schlegel spokesman said. Siemens and ThyssenKrupp, the developers of a high-speed maglev train, called the Transrapid, both said they were unaware of the proposal. The Schlegel spokesman said Siemens and ThyssenKrupp were currently "not involved" in the consortium.

Switzerland
SwissRapide AG in co-operation with the SwissRapide Consortium is developing and promoting an above-ground magnetic levitation (Maglev) monorail system, based on the Transrapid technology. The first projects planned are the lines Bern – Zurich, Lausanne – Geneva as well as Zurich – Winterthur.

United States

Colorado I-70 
Submissions put forward say that maglev offers significantly better performance than rail given the harsh climate and terrain. No technology has been preferred as of November 2013, though construction slated to begin in 2020.

Los Angeles to Las Vegas 

The California–Nevada Interstate Maglev project is a proposed 269 mi (433 km) line from Las Vegas, Nevada to Anaheim, California. One segment would run from Las Vegas to Primm, Nevada, with proposed service to the Las Vegas area's forthcoming Ivanpah Valley Airport. The top speed would be 310 mph (500 km/h).  In August 2014 the backers of the scheme were seeking to revive interest in it.

Other 
There have been several other evaluations conducted in the US including Washington DC to Baltimore, Chattanooga to Atlanta and Pittsburgh to Philadelphia. So far no project has started construction. See list of maglev train proposals in the United States.

Canary Islands
A two line, 120-kilometers (75-mile) long system has been proposed for the island of Tenerife, which is visited by five million tourists per year.  It would connect the island capital Santa Cruz in the north with Costa Adeje in the south and Los Realejos in the northwest with a maximum speed of 270 km/h (169 mph).  The estimated cost is €3 billion.  Transrapid has advantages over a conventional rail plans which would require 35% of its route in tunnels because of the steep terrain on the island.

Rejected systems

Germany

High-speed competition
The Transrapid originated as one of several competing concepts for new land-based high-speed public transportation developed in Germany. In this competition, the Transrapid primarily competed with the InterCityExpress (ICE), a high-speed rail system based on "traditional" railway technology. The ICE “won” in that it was adopted nationwide in Germany, however Transrapid development continued. A number of studies for possible Transrapid lines were conducted after the ICE had entered service, including a long-distance line from Hamburg to Berlin.

Munich link
The most recent German Transrapid line project, and the one that came closest to being built, having previously been approved, was an airport connection track from Munich Central Station to Munich Airport, a  project.  The connection between the train station and airport was close to being built, but was cancelled on 27 March 2008, by the German government due to a massive overrun in costs. Prior to the cancellation, the governing party, the Christian Social Union of Bavaria (CSU), faced internal and local resistance, in particular from communities along the proposed route. The CSU had planned to position Transrapid as an example of future technology and innovation in Bavaria. German federal transport minister Wolfgang Tiefensee announced the decision after a crisis meeting in Berlin at which industry representatives reportedly revealed that costs had risen from €1.85 billion to well over €3 billion ($4.7 billion). This rise in projected costs, however was mostly due to the cost estimates of the construction of the tunnel and related civil engineering after the designated operator Deutsche Bahn AG shifted most of the risk-sharing towards its subcontractors - and not due to the cost of the maglev technology.

United Kingdom
The Transrapid was rejected in 2007 by the UK government for a maglev link between London and Glasgow, via Birmingham, Liverpool/Manchester, Leeds, Teesside, Newcastle and Edinburgh.

Incidents

September 2006 accident

The maintenance vehicle destroyed the first section of the train, then lifted off the track to complete two full rotations before landing in a pile of pre-exploded debris. This was the first major accident involving a Transrapid train. The news media reported 23 fatalities and that several people were severely injured, these being the first fatalities on any maglev. The accident was caused by human error with the first train being allowed to leave the station before the maintenance vehicle had moved off the track. This situation could be avoided in a production environment by installing an automatic collision avoidance system.

SMT fire accident
On 11 August 2006, a Transrapid train running on the Shanghai Maglev Line caught fire. The fire was quickly put out by Shanghai's firefighters. It was reported that the vehicle's on-board batteries may have caused the fire.

Alleged theft of Transrapid technology
In April 2006, new announcements by Chinese officials planning to cut maglev rail costs by a third stirred some strong comments by various German officials and more diplomatic statements of concern from Transrapid officials. Deutsche Welle reported that the China Daily had quoted the State Council encouraging engineers to "learn and absorb foreign advanced technologies while making further innovations." The Chinese deny any technology plagiarism. The China Aviation Industry Corporation has said the new Chinese "Zhui Feng" magnetic train is not dependent on foreign technology. It is much lighter than the Transrapid product, the company said, and features a much more advanced design.

Development history and versions

See also

 Aérotrain
 High-speed rail – for an overview of competitors to this system
 JR-Maglev
 Land speed record for railed vehicles
 Magnetic levitation train

References

External links

 
 ThyssenKrupp Transrapid GmbH
 Der Transrapid 08 in Lathen und seine Vorgänger 
 Comparison of wheel-rail technology and maglev technology 
 Transrapid timeline
  Transrapid Photos China & GER, by International Maglev Board 
 Further Reading - Link to PDF Documents about Transrapid

Electrodynamics
Emerging technologies
Experimental and prototype high-speed trains
High-speed trains of Germany
Land speed record rail vehicles
Maglev
Magnetic propulsion devices
Siemens products